Marmorofusus is a genus of sea snails, marine gastropod molluscs in the subfamily Fusininae  of the family Fasciolariidae, the spindle snails and tulip snails.

Species
 Marmorofusus akitai (Kuroda & Habe, 1961)
 Marmorofusus bishopi (Petuch & Berschauer, 2017)
 Marmorofusus brianoi (Bozzetti, 2006)
 Marmorofusus hedleyi Snyder & Lyons, 2014
 † Marmorofusus idjowensis (Oostingh, 1939) 
 Marmorofusus leptorhynchus (Tapperoni Canefri, 1875)
 Marmorofusus matteus Snyder & Lyons, 2014
 Marmorofusus michaelrogersi (Goodwin, 2001)
 Marmorofusus natalensis Snyder & Lyons, 2014
 Marmorofusus nicobaricus (Röding, 1798)
 Marmorofusus nigrirostratus (E. A. Smith, 1879)
 Marmorofusus oblitus (Reeve, 1847)
 Marmorofusus philippii (Jonas, 1846)
 Marmorofusus polygonoides (Lamarck, 1822)
 Marmorofusus tuberculatus (Lamarck, 1822)
 Marmorofusus tuberosus (Reeve, 1847)
 Marmorofusus undulatus (Gmelin, 1791)
 Marmorofusus verbinneni (Snyder, 2006)
 Marmorofusus vercoi (Snyder, 2004)
 Marmorofusus verrucosus (Gmelin, 1791)
 Marmorofusus wellsi (Snyder, 2004)
Species brought into synonymy
 Marmorofusus brenchleyi (Baird, 1873): synonym of Marmorofusus nicobaricus (Röding, 1798)

References

 Snyder M.A. & Lyons W.G. (2014). The Fusinus nicobaricus (Röding, 1798) group: Marmarofusus gen . nov., with descriptions of three new species (Gastropoda: Fasciolariidae). Vita Malacologica. 12: 37-53
 Vermeij G.J. & Snyder M.A. (2018). Proposed genus-level classification of large species of Fusininae (Gastropoda, Fasciolariidae). Basteria. 82(4-6): 57-82.

External links
 Lyons W.G. & Snyder M.A. (2019). Reassignments to the genus Marmorofusus Snyder & Lyons, 2014 (Neogastropoda: Fasciolariidae: Fusininae) of species from the Red Sea, Indian Ocean, and southwestern Australia. Zootaxa. 4714(1): 1-64

Marmorofusus
Fasciolariidae
Gastropod genera